The rank product is a biologically motivated test for the detection of differentially expressed genes in replicated microarray experiments.
It is a simple non-parametric statistical method based on ranks of fold changes. In addition to its use in expression profiling, it can be used to combine ranked lists in various application domains, including proteomics, metabolomics, statistical meta-analysis, and general feature selection.

Calculation of the rank product

Given n genes and k replicates, let  the rank of gene g in the i-th replicate.

Compute the rank product via the geometric mean:

Determination of significance levels
Simple permutation-based estimation is used to determine how likely a given RP value or better is observed in a random experiment.
 generate p permutations of k rank lists of length n.
 calculate the rank products of the n genes in the p permutations.
 count how many times the rank products of the genes in the permutations are smaller or equal to the observed rank product. Set c to this value.
 calculate the average expected value for the rank product by: .
 calculate the percentage of false positives as :  where  is the rank of gene g in a list of all n genes sorted by increasing .

Exact probability distribution and accurate approximation
Permutation re-sampling  requires  a computationally demanding number of permutations to get reliable estimates of the p-values for the most differentially expressed genes, if n is large. Eisinga, Breitling and Heskes (2013) provide the exact probability mass distribution of the rank product statistic. Calculation of the exact p-values offers a substantial improvement over permutation approximation, most significantly for that part of the distribution rank product analysis is most interested in, i.e., the thin right tail. However, exact statistical significance of large rank products may take unacceptable long amounts of time to compute. Heskes, Eisinga and Breitling (2014) provide a method to determine accurate approximate p-values of the rank product statistic in a computationally fast manner.

See also
 Ranking
 Schulze method
 Comparison of electoral systems
 Arrow's impossibility theorem

References
 Breitling, R., Armengaud, P., Amtmann, A., and Herzyk, P. (2004) Rank Products: A simple, yet powerful, new method to detect differentially regulated genes in replicated microarray experiments, FEBS Letters, 573:83–-92
 
 

Gene expression
Nonparametric statistics
Microarrays